Shibganj Upazila is an upazila of Bogra District in the Division of Rajshahi, Bangladesh. The upazila was created in 1983. It is named after its administrative center, the town of Shibganj.

Geography
It is the northernmost upazila of Bogra District. It borders Rangpur Division to the north, Sonatala and Gabtali upazilas to the east, Bogra Sadar and Kahaloo upazilas to the south, Dupchanchia Upazila to the southwest, and Joypurhat District to the west. The Karatoya River flows south through the upazila.

Demographics

According to the 2011 Bangladesh census, Shibganj Upazila had 99,242 households and a population of 378,700, 5.7% of whom lived in urban areas. 9.0% of the population was under the age of 5. The literacy rate (age 7 and over) was 44.1%, compared to the national average of 51.8%.

Points of interest

Mahasthangarh is the earliest urban archaeological site in Bangladesh. It's also the largest. Lonely Planet describes it as one of Bangladesh's two "most famous and impressive archaeological sites." A museum exhibits artifacts excavated at the site: sculptures, inscriptions, terracotta plaques depicting scenes from daily life, beads, coins, and ceramics shards.

Administration
Shibganj Upazila is divided into Shibganj Municipality and 12 union parishads: Shibganj, Bihar, Roynagar, Buriganj, Majhihatta, Pirab, Atmul, Kichak, Maidanhata, Deuli, Mokamtala, and Saidpur. The union parishads are subdivided into 233 mauzas and 409 villages.

Shibganj Municipality is subdivided into 9 wards and 31 mahallas.

Education

There are seven colleges in the upazila. They include Mohasthan Mahi Sawar Degree College, Mokamtala Womens' Degree College, Pirob United Degree College, Chowdhury Adarsha Mahila College and Govt. M H College, founded in 1972.

The madrasa education system in the upazila includes five fazil madrasas.

Notable residents
 Prafulla Chaki, revolutionary and nationalist, was born in Bihar village under the upazila in 1888.
 Mahmudur Rahman Manna, politician, stood as a Bangladesh Awami League candidate for the Bogra-2 constituency in the General Election of 2001. However, he lost the poll.
 M. R. Akhtar Mukul, author and journalist, migrated to Mahasthangarh after partition in 1947.

See also
Upazilas of Bangladesh
Districts of Bangladesh
Divisions of Bangladesh

References

Upazilas of Bogra District